Acetobacterium carbinolicum is a homoacetogenic, strictly anaerobic bacterium that oxidises primary aliphatic alcohols.

These Gram-positive, non-spore-forming and rod-shaped bacteria grow at optimal temperatures of about 30 °C, but some subspecies are also psychrotolerant, being able to grow at a minimum temperature of 2 °C, as the microorganisms belonging to the subspecies A. carbinolicum kysingense, which have been isolated from fine sand and mud sedimented in a brackish fjord in Jutland, Denmark, where concentrations of sodium chloride (NaCl) in water are up to 4.3%.

References

External links

Type strain of Acetobacterium carbinolicum at BacDive -  the Bacterial Diversity Metadatabase

Eubacteriaceae
Anaerobes
Acetogens
Bacteria described in 1985